Al-Bireh Institute is a Palestinian football team based in Al-Bireh, just outside Ramallah, that plays in the West Bank Premier League.The club was founded in 1953 and is one of the oldest football clubs in Palestine.

Achievements

Current squad

Affiliated Clubs
  Persijap
  Kelantan FA

References

External links
League at fifa.com

Football clubs in the West Bank